Ljubo Nenadić (born 29 April 1986) is a Serbian football defender who plays for Šumadija 1903.

Honours
 Red Star Belgrade
 Serbian SuperLiga: 2013–14

Radnički Kragujevac
Serbian League West: 2016–17

References

External sources
 Ljubo Nenadić stats at utakmica.rs 
 

1986 births
Living people
Sportspeople from Kragujevac
Serbian footballers
FK Teleoptik players
RFK Grafičar Beograd players
FK Šumadija 1903 players
FK Radnički 1923 players
FK Metalac Gornji Milanovac players
Red Star Belgrade footballers
FK Novi Pazar players
FK Mladost Lučani players
Serbian First League players
Serbian SuperLiga players
Association football defenders